Tania Fédor (3 November 1905 – 1 December 1985) was a French actress who played a number of leading roles during the 1930s and early 1940s in films such as Fantômas (1932). She later settled in Canada where she worked on French language productions.

Selected filmography
 The Little Cafe (1931)
 When Love Is Over (1931)
 Fantômas (1932)
 Kiss Me (1932)
 La mille et deuxième nuit (1933)
 The Queen and the Cardinal (1935)
 The Men Without Names (1937)
 Southern Bar (1938)
 Crossroads (1938)
 Strangers in the House (1942)
 Lucrèce Borgia (1953)
 The Adventurer of Chad (1953)
 À tout prendre (1963)
 Rope Around the Neck (La corde au cou) - 1965

References

Bibliography
 Hardy, Phil (ed.) The BFI Companion to Crime. University of California Press, 1997.
 Kennedy-Karpat, Colleen. Rogues, Romance, and Exoticism in French Cinema of the 1930s. Fairleigh Dickinson, 2013.

External links
 

1905 births
1985 deaths
Actresses from Montreal
Canadian expatriates in Monaco
Canadian film actresses
Canadian television actresses
French emigrants to Canada
French expatriates in Monaco
French film actresses
French people of Russian descent
Monegasque film actresses
People from Monte Carlo
20th-century Canadian actresses
20th-century French actresses